Saint Andrew North East is a parliamentary constituency represented in the House of Representatives of the Jamaican Parliament. It elects one Member of Parliament MP by the first past the post system of election.

Boundaries 

The constituency consists of the areas of Barbican and Waterloo.

References

Parliamentary constituencies of Jamaica